Ramayyagari Subhash Reddy is a former Judge of the Supreme Court of India. He has also served as Chief Justice of Gujarat High Court and Judge of Andhra Pradesh High Court.

Career 
Shri Justice Ramayyagari Subhash Reddy, B.Sc., LL.B., was born on 5 January 1957. He was enrolled as an Advocate on 30 October 1980 and practiced at Tribunals, Civil Courts and Andhra Pradesh High Court including before the Supreme Court in Civil, Criminal, Constitutional, Revenue, Taxation, Labour, Company and Service matters in both original and appellate side. His field of specialization is in Constitutional Law. He was appointed an Additional Judge of the Andhra Pradesh High Court on 2 December 2002. He was appointed Permanent Judge on 24 June 2004. He was appointed Chief Justice of Gujarat High Court on 13 February 2016. He was appointed  Judge of Supreme Court of India on 2 November 2018. He retired on 4 January 2022.

References

1957 births
Living people
Justices of the Supreme Court of India
21st-century Indian judges
Chief Justices of the Gujarat High Court
Judges of the Andhra Pradesh High Court